Naive semantics is an approach used in computer science for representing basic knowledge about a specific domain, and has been used in applications such as the representation of the meaning of natural language sentences in artificial intelligence applications. In a general setting the term has been used to refer to the use of a limited store of generally understood knowledge about a specific domain in the world, and has been applied to fields such as the knowledge based design of data schemas.

In natural language understanding, naive semantics involves the use of a lexical theory which maps each word sense to a simple theory (or set of assertions) about the objects or events of reference. In this sense, naive semantic theory is based upon a particular language, its syntax and its word senses. For instance the word "water" and the assertion water(X) may be associated with the three predicates clear(X), liquid(X) and tasteless(X).

References 

Natural language processing
Semantics